Marco Fabbri (born 2 February 1988) is an Italian ice dancer. With his skating partner, Charlène Guignard, he is the 2023 European Champion, a two-time European Championship bronze medalist (2019, 2022), a two-time Grand Prix Final bronze medalist (2018–19, 2022–23), and five-time Italian national champion. The two are also five-time Lombardia Trophy champions, two-time Golden Spin of Zagreb champions, and eight-time Italian national silver medalists. They represented Italy at the 2014, 2018 and 2022 Winter Olympics.

Personal life 
Marco Fabbri was born on 2 February 1988 in Milan, Italy. He is the elder brother of Italian ice dancer Andrea Fabbri. He and Guignard have been in a relationship since 2009.

Career

Early career 
Fabbri began learning to skate in 1995. He won Italy's novice ice dancing title with Stefania Berton but then concentrated on singles from 2001 to 2007. As a single skater, he won two junior national titles and three senior national medals – bronze in 2004 and 2005 and silver in 2007. Deciding to return to ice dancing, he teamed up with Paola Amati and won the 2009 junior national bronze medal. He also competed with Francesca Mangini.

2010–11 season: Debut of Guignard/Fabbri 
Fabbri and France's Charlène Guignard found each other on Icepartnersearch and began skating together after a try-out in May 2009. They began competing together for Italy in the 2010–11 season, coached by Barbara Fusar-Poli. They finished fourth in their international debut, at the 2010 NRW Trophy, before winning the bronze medal at the 2010 Golden Spin of Zagreb. The duo took the silver medal at the Italian Championships. In April 2011, they were sent to their first ISU Championship – the 2011 World Championships in Moscow, Russia. They qualified for the free dance and finished nineteenth overall.

2011–12 season 
In the 2011–12 season, Guignard/Fabbri repeated as the Italian national silver medalists and placed eleventh at their first European Championships in Sheffield, England.

2012–13 season: Grand Prix debut 
In 2012–13, Guignard/Fabbri debuted on the Grand Prix series, placing fifth at the 2012 Cup of China. Ranked eighth in both segments, they finished ninth at the 2013 European Championships in Zagreb, Croatia. At the 2013 World Championships in London, Ontario, Canada, they were sixteenth in the short dance, fifteenth in the free dance, and seventeenth overall.

2013–14 season: Sochi Olympics 
Guignard/Fabbri began the 2013–14 season with a silver medal at the 2013 Ondrej Nepela Trophy and then placed seventh at their sole Grand Prix event, the 2013 Skate Canada International. They were awarded gold at the 2013 NRW Trophy before winning their fourth consecutive national silver medal. In January 2014, they finished eighth at the European Championships in Budapest, Hungary. In February, Guignard/Fabbri represented Italy at the 2014 Winter Olympics in Sochi, Russia; they placed fifteenth in the short dance, fourteenth in the free, and fourteenth overall. They had the same final result in March at the 2014 World Championships in Saitama, Japan, after placing seventeenth in the short and twelfth in the free dance.

2014–15 season 
Making their Challenger Series (CS) debut, Guignard/Fabbri won the silver medal at the 2014 Ondrej Nepela Trophy. Having received two Grand Prix invitations, they placed sixth at the 2014 Skate America and fifth at the 2014 Trophée Éric Bompard. They were awarded silver medals in December at the 2014 CS Golden Spin of Zagreb and Italian Championships. The two finished sixth at the 2015 European Championships in Stockholm, Sweden, and twelfth at the 2015 World Championships in Shanghai, China.

2015–16 season 
Guignard/Fabbri placed fourth at both of their 2015–16 Grand Prix events, the 2015 Skate Canada International and 2015 Rostelecom Cup. Turning to the Challenger Series, they won gold medals at the 2015 Warsaw Cup and 2015 Golden Spin of Zagreb.

Again the silver medalists at Italian nationals, Guignard/Fabbri were seventh at the European Championships and tenth at the World Championships.

2016–17 season 
Guignard/Fabbri defended their title at the 2016 CS Golden Spin of Zagreb and also won the 2016 CS Lombardia Trophy.  They placed fourth at both of their events on the 2016–17 Grand Prix and won their seventh silver medal at the Italian Championships.  They placed sixth at the 2017 European Championships, and eleventh at the 2017 World Championships.

2017–18 season: Pyeongchang Olympics 
The duo began the season with their second straight victory at Lombardia, as well as a silver medal at the 2017 CS Golden Spin of Zagreb.  They placed fifth at both of their Grand Prix assignments and won their eighth silver medal at the Italian Championships.  The two finished fifth at the 2018 European Championships.

Guignard/Fabbri competed at their second Olympics in Pyeongchang, where they placed tenth. They finished the season at the 2018 World Championships, held in their training location of Milan, and placed ninth.  Their result, combined with the fourth-place finish of Anna Cappellini and Luca Lanotte, earned Italy three spots at the following year's world championships.

2018–19 season: Grand Prix and European bronze, first national title 

Beginning the season at the 2018 CS Lombardia Trophy, Guignard/Fabbri won their third straight title.  Competing at the 2018 Skate America event, they won the silver medal, the team's first on the Grand Prix.  Fabbri remarked that the medal "is a great reward for us. We started from zero when Charléne and I started skating together. I had just started ice dance, and she didn't have international experience. We are proud of what we have achieved."  They won silver at their second event, the 2018 Grand Prix of Helsinki, as well, despite a fall in the free dance. These results qualified them for the Grand Prix Final for the first time in their careers.  At the Final, they placed second in the rhythm dance and third in the free dance, capturing the bronze medal overall.

Following their Grand Prix success, Guignard/Fabbri won the Italian national title for the first time in their career.  At the 2019 European Championships, they placed third in the rhythm dance, behind Papadakis/Cizeron and Stepanova/Bukin.  Expected medal contenders Sinitsina/Katsalapov made serious errors that took them effectively out of contention.  Guignard/Fabbri were fourth in the free dance, behind Sinitsina/Katsalapov in third, but won the bronze medal overall.  Fabbri opined that the free dance had been "our best performance. Scores don't always tell the truth. Sometimes you feel you skated better, but you get less. Sometimes you feel you didn't skate that well and you get more points. This time we felt we skated our best."

Guignard/Fabbri placed eighth at the 2019 World Championships in Saitama and concluded the season as part of Team Italy at the 2019 World Team Trophy.

2019–20 season 
Guignard/Fabbri won their fourth consecutive gold medal at the Lombardia Trophy to begin the season.  Shortly afterwards, Fabbri injured the tendons in his right hand, and for some time, the team contemplated withdrawing from the Grand Prix as a result.  However, a week before the 2019 Internationaux de France, the decision was made to compete.  They placed third in the rhythm dance while being the only team to correctly execute all key points on the pattern dance.  Third in the free dance as well, Fabbri remarked afterwards, "we didn't think we would have been here until one week ago. We couldn't expect more from this competition."  Following the French Grand Prix, Guignard/Fabbri opted to discard their original Paramour-themed rhythm dance in favour of music from Grease.  Fabbri attributed the change to a desire for "something more understandable for the audience as well because the old program had unrecognizable music."  They were third in the rhythm dance.  They placed fourth in the free dance after Guignard fell on a lift exit, winning their second bronze medal of the Grand Prix season.  Fabbri said they had not had as much time to practice the rhythm dance whilst working to change the rhythm dance. 

After winning a second national title, Guignard/Fabbri competed at the 2020 European Championships and placed third in the rhythm dance, winning the small bronze medal.  They were scheduled to skate last in the free dance, which became a protracted wait following technical issues in assessing the score for the penultimate team Papadakis/Cizeron. Placing fourth in that segment, they dropped to fourth place overall.  They had been assigned to compete at the World Championships in Montreal, but these were cancelled as a result of the coronavirus pandemic.

2020–21 season 
With the coronavirus pandemic affecting international travel, the ISU opted to assign the Grand Prix based primarily on geographic location and Guignard/Fabbri were assigned to the 2020 Internationaux de France. The competition was later cancelled. Instead, Guignard/Fabbri began their season by winning gold at the Third Stage of the Italian Gran Premio, a grand prix competition for Italian skaters hosted by the FISG. A week later, they won their third national title. Guignard/Fabbri then went on to win the Fourth Stage and the Final of the Italian Gran Premio.

Guignard/Fabbri were assigned to compete at the 2021 World Championships, held in a bubble in Stockholm. They placed sixth in both segments and overall and earned a new personal best in the free dance. Because the second Italian dance team, national silver medalists Moscheni/Fioretti, did not make the free dance, Italy only qualified one dance berth at the 2022 Winter Olympics, with the possibility of a second to be qualified later. Guignard/Fabbri finished the season as part of Team Italy at the 2021 World Team Trophy, where they placed second in both segments, earning new personals bests in the free dance and total score, and helping Team Italy to finish in fourth place overall.

2021–22 season: Beijing Olympics 
Guignard/Fabbri began the season winning the fifth consecutive gold medal at the Lombardia Trophy. On the Grand Prix, they won the silver medal at their first event, 2021 Skate Canada International. Guignard cited jet lag as having hindered their performance somewhat but said, "the crowd was really nice, and it was nice to finally perform in front of people." They won their second Grand Prix silver of the season at 2021 Rostelecom Cup. The results qualified them for the Grand Prix Final, to be held in Osaka, but it was subsequently cancelled due to restrictions prompted by the Omicron variant.

At the Italian championships in Turin, Guignard/Fabbri won their fourth consecutive national title. They were thereafter named to their third Italian Olympic team. At the 2022 European Championships in Tallinn, Guignard/Fabbri won their second bronze medal, despite their longtime coach Barbara Fusar-Poli being unable to participate due to testing positive for COVID-19. Fabbri said it had been "mentally and physically difficult" to compete, as this had been their first event without her in twelve years.

Guignard/Fabbri began the 2022 Winter Olympics as the Italian entries in the rhythm dance segment of the Olympic team event. They placed third in the segment, narrowly prevailing over Canadians Gilles/Poirier, securing eight points for Italy and the highest placement for their team in any segment. Despite their strong performance, Team Italy overall was unable to advance to the second stage of the competition and finished seventh. Competing next in the dance event, they were seventh in the rhythm dance. Guignard/Fabbri placed fifth in the free dance, capitalizing on errors by Gilles/Poirier and Russians Stepanova/Bukin, and moved up to fifth place overall. Thinking on the future, Fabbri mused, "having an Olympic Games in Milan, Italy, which is my home town, and where Charlène has been living for more than ten years, is inviting. It will be something that will push us and make us reflect a lot more."

Guignard and Fabbri finished the season at the 2022 World Championships in Montpellier. The event was held without Russian dance teams being present due to the International Skating Union banning all Russian athletes due to their country's invasion of Ukraine. Guignard/Fabbri placed fourth in the rhythm dance, again ahead of Gilles/Poirier, but several points back of the top three. Fourth in the free dance as well, they finished fourth overall, with a personal best total score of 209.92. Fabbri indicated that they planned to continue the following season.

2022–23 season: European champions 
Guignard and Fabbri entered the new Olympic cycle perceived as one of the discipline's top teams, with Russian dance teams continuing to be banned. Once again beginning the season at the Lombardia Trophy, they won another gold medal, setting a new personal best in the rhythm dance in the process.

Entering their first Grand Prix assignment, the 2022 Grand Prix de France, as the title favourites, they won both segments to take the gold medal, their first Grand Prix title. Fabbri described this milestone as a "really emotional moment" and said it was fitting that it happened in Guignard's birth country of France. They were also assigned to compete the following week at the 2022 MK John Wilson Trophy, held in lieu of the traditional Cup of China, the latter having been cancelled due to China's pandemic restrictions. Guignard and Fabbri mistakenly drove to Birmingham rather than the event's actual location in Sheffield initially, but nevertheless arrived in time and won the rhythm dance over home favourites Fear/Gibson. They won the free dance as well with a new personal best score, setting a new best for total score as well, taking their second Grand Prix gold and qualifying for the Grand Prix Final for the third time.

Guignard and Fabbri entered the Grand Prix Final as the second-ranked team behind Canadian champions Gilles/Poirier, with the event occurring on home ice in Turin. They placed third in the rhythm dance behind Gilles/Poirier and pre-season favourites Chock/Bates, who had previously struggled. Despite making revisions to their music and choreography before the event in the hopes of improving their scores, they recorded lower marks in the segment than previously. They were third in the free dance as well, notably losing levels on some normally reliable elements like their dance spin and winning their second Final bronze medal. Fabbri remarked that "our performance wasn't perfect; we were feeling hard on our legs. However, we are pretty satisfied with our performance, just a little disappointed about the score. Honestly, this is one of the lowest scores we ever had."

Entering the 2023 European Championships as the title favourites, Guignard/Fabbri won the rhythm dance over Britons Fear/Gibson by a margin of 1.11 points. Guignard expressed disappointment that changes made to their rotational lift had not resulted in better scores, as they felt it was more musical. They won the free dance as well, despite what Fabri called "some little mistakes," such as Guignard losing a twizzle level. They won the European title for the first time, also the first time for an Italian team since 2014. He called it "the work of a lifetime."

Programs

With Guignard

With Amati

Single skating

Results 
GP: Grand Prix; CS: Challenger Series; JGP: Junior Grand Prix

With Guignard

With Amati

Single skating

Detailed results

With Guignard

With Amati

Men's Singles

References

External links 

 
 
 

1988 births
Living people
Italian male single skaters
Italian male ice dancers
Figure skaters from Milan
Figure skaters at the 2014 Winter Olympics
Figure skaters at the 2018 Winter Olympics
Figure skaters at the 2022 Winter Olympics
Olympic figure skaters of Italy
Universiade medalists in figure skating
Universiade gold medalists for Italy
Competitors at the 2015 Winter Universiade
Figure skaters of Fiamme Azzurre
European Figure Skating Championships medalists
21st-century Italian people